Punjab and Haryana High Court  is the common High Court for the Indian states of Punjab and Haryana and the Union Territory of Chandigarh based in Chandigarh, India. Sanctioned strength of Judges of this High Court is 85 consisting of 64 Permanent Judges and 21 Additional Judges including Chief Justice. As of 16 August 2022, there are 57 Judges working in the High Court, comprising 40 Permanent and 17 Additional Judges.

The court building is known as the Palace of Justice. Designed by Le Corbusier, it and several of his other works were inscribed as UNESCO World Heritage Sites in July 2016.

Sarv Mittra Sikri, who had been practising in the High Court of Punjab and Haryana and remained Advocate General of Punjab from 1 November 1956 to 2 February 1964, was the first to be appointed as judge of the Supreme Court of India on 3 February 1964 directly from the Bar. Later becoming the Chief Justice of India on 22 January 1971, again with the distinction of being first of only two CJIs directly from the Bar.

Past judges include Madan Mohan Punchhi, P. Sathasivam, Tirath Singh Thakur, Jagdish Singh Khehar and Ranjan Gogoi who were elevated to the Supreme Court of India and became Chief Justice of India.

History

Formation

Punjab and Haryana High Court was formerly known as Lahore High Court, which was established on 21 March 1919. The jurisdiction of that court covered undivided Punjab and Delhi. From 1920 to 1943, the Court was conferred with extraterritorial jurisdiction over that part of China that formed part of the British consular district of Kashgar, which had previously been under the jurisdiction of the British Supreme Court for China. This ceased upon the ratification of the British-Chinese Treaty for the Relinquishment of Extra-Territorial Rights in China.

Independence-induced split
Following the independence of India and its Partition on 15 August 1947, a separate High Court of East Punjab was created by the Governor General's High Courts (Punjab) Order, 1947 issued under Section 9 of the Indian Independence Act, 1947, based at historic Peterhoff building in Shimla for the territories as included in the then Province of East Punjab and the then Province of Delhi. This had jurisdiction over the erstwhile territories of Patiala and East Punjab States Union and the Punjab Province of British India, which covers now areas of Indian Punjab, Delhi, Himachal Pradesh and Haryana. It was at Peterhoff where the trial of Nathuram Godse, who assassinated Mahatma Gandhi, took place in 1948–49.

On introduction of the Constitution of India on 26 January 1950, the State of East Punjab came to be known as the Punjab and accordingly, the name of the High Court was also changed as High Court of Punjab. Simultaneously, Patiala and East Punjab States Union (PEPSU), which was created by uniting eight princely states on 15 July 1948, was also made a Part 'B' State with a separate High Court of Patiala and East Punjab States Union (PEPSU). As per Article 214(2) of the Constitution of India, the High Court was to be continued along with other High Courts. 

From 17 January 1955, the Court was moved to its present location in Chandigarh. 

By States Reorganisation Act, 1956, Patiala and East Punjab States Union (PEPSU) was merged in the State of Punjab on 1st November, 1956. The Judges of the High Court of Patiala and East Punjab States Union (PEPSU) became Judges of the Punjab High Court. The strength of High Court of Punjab, which had originally 8 Judges, rose to 13.

Renaming and Reduction of Jurisdiction
The Punjab Reorganisation Act, 1966 paved the way for the formation of Haryana and the Union Territory of Chandigarh from 1 November 1966. Those formations also saw the renaming of the High Court of Punjab as the High Court of Punjab and Haryana. The Judges of the High Court of Punjab became Judges of the common High Court with all the powers and jurisdiction of the High Court of Punjab. However, the principal seat of the High Court remained at Chandigarh. Punjab and Haryana High Court at Chandigarh has original as well as appellate and supervisory jurisdiction over all matters pertaining to Chandigarh (a Union Territory and also capital of Punjab and Haryana), Punjab and Haryana. The High Court of Punjab and Haryana has operated since 1 November 1966 in its present form.

A Circuit Bench of the High Court of Punjab had been working at Delhi since 1952, which was replaced by constituting a separate High Court for the Union Territory of Delhi on 31 October 1966 under the Delhi High Court Act, 1966.  Three Judges of the Punjab High Court were transferred to the Delhi High Court, which includes a famous Judge-Hans Raj Khanna.

Following area of State of Punjab namely Shimla, Kangra, Kullu and Lahaul and Spiti Districts; Nalagarh tehsil of Ambala District; Lohara, Amb and Una kanungo circles, some area of Santokhgarh kanungo circle and some other specified area of Una tehsil of Hoshiarpur District besides some parts of Dhar Kalan Kanungo circle of Pathankot tehsil of Gurdaspur District; were merged with Himachal Pradesh on 1 November 1966 as per Section 5 of the Punjab Reorganisation Act, 1966 and thus the jurisdiction of the High Court was reduced.

Chandigarh court building architecture
Le Corbusier, a well-known, French architect, was chosen to execute the project of building the high court. India's first Prime Minister, Jawaharlal Nehru, enthusiastically supported the project and took a sustained interest in its execution. When he visited the project on 2 April 1952, he declared "Let this be a new town symbolic of the freedom of India, unfettered by the traditions of the past, an expression of the nation's faith in the future."

List of Chief Justices
 Legends: 
 ACJ – Acting Chief Justice
 Res – Resigned

List of Chief Justices.

Current Judges

List of former Chief Justices

Notes
ACJ – Acting Chief Justice
Res – Resigned

Digitization
Punjab and Haryana high court is high court where entire record of the decision and pending cases have been digitized. Digitized record paved way for many unique applications such as
Issuance of certified copies directly from digitized records depository as it is digitally signed.
Availability of records of decided and pending cases for court reference in soft form.
Facility of inspection of case files in soft copy from DMS(e- inspection).
To provide paper books to the all e-diary account holders.
Use of digitized records for the issuance of e- notices by the court.
Any hard copy of a paper book, if lost, can be reconstructed without any loss of time, if required.

The figures of the work done are as under:

Virtual private network
VPN connection has been provided to honourable judges of high court for accessing DMS for scanned paper books from their camp office or from any other place.

e- diary
e-diary is a feature whereby account holders can manage their own case portfolio and view the cases filed or represented by them. Online status of the case along with interim and final orders/ judgments were made available through e-diary. All identified cases of different departments such as Income tax department, Insurance company, Union of India, Advocates General of Punjab and Haryana are automatically pushed in their online e-diary accounts. In addition to the e-diary system, the state governments are in develop court cases monitoring system(CCMS) through which they will monitor pending cases in the Supreme court of India.

e- filing
Online web based e- filing module is functional for filing cases 24 X 7.e- filed cases expedite issuance of copies of orders, summons and is a step towards paperless court regime. It is made compulsory to file cases on online.

Personal information system
In the house, the software has been developed, which contains personal profile and service record of the judicial officer. Access to relevant information has been given at different levels such as Administrative judge, registrar general, registrar vigilance, district judge and the officer concerned.

Updating information of case after final decision
Decided cases are available on the website of the high court. On many occasions, the final order is reviewed/ modified or challenged by filing into court appeal. Status subsequent to final disposal of the matter is shown and when print out of final order is taken from the website. The printout carries a message showing the up-to-date status of the case.

Precedence setting cases
In a case of cow-smuggling, the Punjab and Haryana High Court while treating animals as the "legal person" mandated that "entire animal kingdom including avian and aquatic" species has a "distinct legal persona with corresponding rights, duties, and liabilities of a living person" and humans are "loco parentis" while laying out the norms for animal welfare, veterinary treatment, fodder and shelter, e.g. animal drawn carriages must not have more than four humans, and load carrying animals must not be loaded beyond the specified limits and those limits must be halved when animals have to carry the load up a slope.

See also
 List of World Heritage Sites in India

References

Buildings and structures in Chandigarh
Le Corbusier buildings in India
1947 establishments in India
Courts and tribunals established in 1919